Zhang Ben (born 22 July 1985 in Harbin, Heilongjiang) is a Chinese female ice hockey player.  She is a member of the China women's national ice hockey team. She competed for China at the 2010 Winter Olympics. The team finished 7th out of 8 teams.

References

1985 births
Living people
Chinese women's ice hockey players
Ice hockey players at the 2010 Winter Olympics
Olympic ice hockey players of China
Sportspeople from Harbin
Asian Games medalists in ice hockey
Ice hockey players at the 2003 Asian Winter Games
Ice hockey players at the 2007 Asian Winter Games
Ice hockey players at the 2011 Asian Winter Games
Medalists at the 2003 Asian Winter Games
Medalists at the 2007 Asian Winter Games
Medalists at the 2011 Asian Winter Games
Asian Games bronze medalists for China